Puerto Rico Sol FC is a Puerto Rican association football club from Mayagüez that currently plays in the Liga Puerto Rico, the highest level of football in the country.

History
Puerto Rico Sol FC was founded in 2016 by Shek Borkowski with Jose Luis Perez Torres joining in 2018. Borkowski, a native of Poland, also previously co-founded FC Indiana and Chicago Red Stars. The club joined the nascent Liga Puerto Rico for the 2018/2019 season.

Stadium

For the 2018-19 Liga Puerto Rico season, Sol played its home matches at the 4,000-seat Fajardo Soccer Stadium in Fajardo.

In May 2019 Sol FC signed a contract with the city of Mayagüez to play its home matches at the Mayagüez Athletics Stadium. As part of the deal, Sol FC would have the right to exclusive use of the stadium through 2023. The stadium is owned by the city of Mayagüez and has a capacity of 12,175 with 5,100 of those being roofed seats. It was constructed to host the athletics and soccer games of the 2010 Central American and Caribbean Games.

Current squad

Domestic history
Key

References

External links 
 Official Puerto Rico Sol Page
 Puerto Rico Sol Official Facebook Page

Football clubs in Puerto Rico
Puerto Rico Soccer League teams
2017 establishments in Puerto Rico
Association football clubs established in 2017